Uniejów Castle - one of the main places of interest in Uniejów, Łódź Voivodeship; in Poland.

The castle was built between 1360-1365 on the site of a former wooden fortress, destroyed after a raid by the Teutonic Knights in 1331. The initiator of the construction of the castle was Gniezno's Archbishop Jarosław Bogoria Skotnicki, one of the closest associates to Casimir III the Great.

The building was greatly expanded and modernised between 1525-1534, when after a fire most of the castle's Gothic characteristics had gone. The stronghold had ended's its militaristic significance in the seventeenth century, when the castle became a residence. In 1836 the castle was taken over by the House of Toll, an Estonian family. In 1848, Aleksander Toll had reconstructed the castle into a Classical architectural style. The castle in Uniejów is a prime example of accretion of architectural styles.

Gallery

See also
Castles in Poland

References

Buildings and structures completed in 1365
Houses completed in 1848
Castles in Łódź Voivodeship
Poddębice County